François Albert Mautin (9 May 1907 – 27 October 2003) was a French ice hockey player. He competed in the men's tournament at the 1928 Winter Olympics. He was a grandson of the jeweler Henri Vever, with Mautin inheriting his art collection, which was later sold to the Smithsonian Institution for $7 million.

References

1907 births
2003 deaths
Ice hockey players at the 1928 Winter Olympics
Olympic ice hockey players of France
Ice hockey people from Paris